Khiyaban-e Litkuh may refer to:
 Bala Khiyaban-e Litkuh Rural District
 Pain Khiyaban-e Litkuh Rural District